Kuebler–Artes Building is a historic commercial building located in downtown Evansville, Indiana. It was designed by the architecture firm Shopbell & Company and built in 1915. It is a three-story, one-bay, Prairie School style brick building.

It was listed on the National Register of Historic Places in 1984.

References

Commercial buildings on the National Register of Historic Places in Indiana
Prairie School architecture in Indiana
Commercial buildings completed in 1915
Buildings and structures in Evansville, Indiana
National Register of Historic Places in Evansville, Indiana